Henrietta Cornelia Mears (October 23, 1890 – March 19, 1963) was a Christian educator, evangelist, and author who had a significant impact on evangelical Christianity in the 20th century and one of the founders of the National Sunday School Association Best known as the innovative and dynamic Director of Christian Education at First Presbyterian Church of Hollywood, California and in charge of the college and young adult people in the mid-1900s, she built a dedicated, enthusiastic staff, trained and mentored her teachers and implemented a graded, age-appropriate curriculum from “cradle roll” to adults. Henrietta lectured and wrote passionately about Sunday school's power to teach others the Bible. Within two years, Sunday School attendance at Hollywood “Pres” was averaging more than 4,200 per week. She served in leading the Sunday School program from 400 to 6500. Henrietta Mears taught the college age program herself. Henrietta Mears was one of the most influential Christian leaders of the 20th Century. Mears is believed by many theologians to have most directly shaped Bill Bright’s Four Spiritual Laws, which defined modern evangelism in the 20th century.

She was a gifted educator and was known as "Teacher" by those in her program. Her book," has sold over three million copies.

Literally hundreds of men and women came out of her Sunday School program into full-time Christian service, including 1st Presbyterian Hollywood's Louis Evans, Sr.'s son; Louis H. Evans, Jr. (Colleen Townsend Evans), who became the organizing pastor of Bel Air Presbyterian church; Bill Bright and his wife Vonette Zachary Bright, founder of Campus Crusade for Christ, which lived in and worked out of Henrietta's house for 10 years; Billy Graham; Reverend L. David Cowie, pastor of University Presbyterian Church in Seattle, Washington, 1948 to 1961; Donn Moomaw, a UCLA All American football player in 1951, who later became Ronald Reagan's pastor at Bel Air Presbyterian Church in Bel Air, California and Frederick Dale Bruner, a biblical scholar best known for his commentaries on Matthew and John.

Early life
Henrietta Cornelia Mears was born on October 23, 1890, in Fargo, North Dakota, the seventh child of banker E. Ashley Mears and Baptist laywoman Margaret Burtis Everts, whose father had been an influential Chicago pastor. Already 42 when Henrietta arrived, Margaret died when her youngest daughter was only 20. (An obituary tribute said, "as a Bible teacher she had few equals in the city of Minneapolis").

Henrietta's father, E. Ashley Mears was the President of First Bank of North Dakota and sold mortgages to private investors. At the height of his business, he owned approximately 20 banks. Originally wealthy, the Mears family lost most of their money in the Panic of 1893 and re-settled in Minneapolis. Here Henrietta inaugurated her early schooling by announcing that she was bored with kindergarten because it was "to amuse little children, and I'm amused enough. I want to be educated." At seven years old she declared she was ready to become a Christian and joined the First Baptist Church of Minneapolis.

Henrietta was troubled by poor health, contracting muscular rheumatism at age 12. Though the prayers of a family friend brought healing, she suffered from bad eyesight all her life, and her doctors advised her that if she continued her studies (she planned to enroll in the University of Minnesota) she would be blind by age 30. Her response was, "Then blind I shall be—but I want something in my head to think about." She graduated from the University of Minnesota in 1913, still able to see, and began teaching chemistry at rural high schools. In 1915, Henrietta returned to Minneapolis to teach at Central High School and live with her sister. In Minneapolis, Henrietta attended the First Baptist Church where she was encouraged to apply educational standards to Sunday School programs. After teaching Sunday School for over a decade,  in 1927, Henrietta took a sabbatical to California. While there she visited First Presbyterian Church Hollywood which had a Sunday School of 450 students.

Public education might have remained Henrietta's life work if not for an encounter with Stuart MacLennan, pastor of the First Presbyterian Church of Hollywood, who spoke at the Mears' sisters' church in Minneapolis in the 1920s. In 1927, Henrietta took a sabbatical year to consider whether she should enter Christian work full-time. She and Margaret traveled to California, where the sisters visited Dr. MacLennan's church and Henrietta spoke. Before Henrietta left, MacLennan offered her the Director of Christian Education post, and in 1928, she and Margaret moved to Hollywood.

Selected works
 What the Bible is All About, Regal Books, 1953 
 '''God's Plan, Regal Books, 2008 
 Teacher, Regal Books, 2006 
 
 
 
 
 
 

Notes

References
 Ambitious for God, http://www.christianitytoday.com/ch/2006/issue92/5.30.html
 Biographical Dictionary of Evangelicals, https://www.amazon.com/Biographical-Dictionary-Evangelicals-Timothy-Larsen/dp/0851119964 Inter-Varsity Press, Timothy Larsen, editor
 Dream Big: The Henrietta Mears Story, http://www.christianbook.com/dream-big-the-henrietta-mears-story/earl-roe/9780830763870/pd/763870 Regal Books, 1990, Earl Roe, editor
 Henrietta Mears http://www.kamglobal.org/BiographicalSketches/henriettamears.html
 Memorial Service, http://www.discogs.com/Various-In-Memoriam-Memorial-Service-For-Henrietta-C-Mears/release/2735979
 Mother of Modern Evangelicalism: The Life and Legacy of Henrietta Mears'', https://www.christianbook.com/mother-american-evangelicalism-legacy-henrietta-mears/arlin-migliazzo/9780802877925/pd/877922?event=ESRCN Eerdmans Publishing, Arlin C. Migliazzo

American evangelicals
Christian writers
Editors of Christian publications
1890 births
1963 deaths
Writers from Fargo, North Dakota